"The Lie" is an American television play broadcast on April 24, 1973 as the first installment of the CBS Playhouse 90 series.  The production was based on a play by Ingmar Bergman. The cast included George Segal, Shirley Knight, Robert Culp, Dean Jaffer, Louise Lasser, and William Daniels. The play was a drama depicting the interactions of a group of wealthy people.

The production was nominated for five Primetime Emmy Awards and won four:
 Charles Kreiner and Jan Scott, winner, Best Art Direction or Scenic Design For a Dramatic Program or Feature Length Film, for a Series, a Single Program of a Series or a Special Program 
 William M. Klages, winner, Outstanding Achievement in Lighting Direction
 Lewis W. Smith, nominee, Outstanding Achievement in Video Tape Editing
 Charles Kreiner and Jan Scott, winner, Art Decorator and Set Decorator of the Year.

References

American television films
1973 television plays
Films based on works by Ingmar Bergman